Christian Bank (born 25 April 1974) is a Danish former footballer who played as a defender.

References

1974 births
Living people
Association football defenders
Danish men's footballers
Næstved Boldklub players
Boldklubben af 1893 players
Malmö FF players
Danish Superliga players
Allsvenskan players
Danish expatriate men's footballers
Expatriate footballers in Sweden
Danish expatriate sportspeople in Sweden